Foadan Football Club is a Togolese football club based in Dapaong, a commercial city in the Northern Togo. The club was founded in 1974.

Football clubs in Togo
1974 establishments in Togo